The Esquires were an American R&B group from Milwaukee, Wisconsin, United States, principally active from 1957 to 1976.

History 
The group first formed in 1957 around the Moorer family: Gilbert (born Gilbert Moorer, Jr., August 20, 1941, Birmingham, Alabama, died August 28, 2008), his brother Alvis (born Alvis V. Moorer, January 18, 1940, Birmingham, Alabama, died August 21, 2011), and their sister Betty. They first performed as Betty Moorer and the Esquires. When their sister and lead singer left, the group shortened its name to The Esquires, and Gilbert became lead singer. In 1961, Sam Pace (born Sammie L. Pace, September 22, 1944, Kansas City, Missouri, died January 7, 2013) joined as a tenor. Millard Edwards, a bass, also sang during this period in place of Taylor.  They went through many lineup changes over their first decade, which saw them aiming mostly for local recognition. In 1966, they moved to Chicago, Illinois, and auditioned for Curtis Mayfield, who was not interested in signing them. They then attempted to sign with Constellation Records, but the record label went under at the end of 1966; they signed instead with Bunky Records, Constellation's successor. Bunky was distributed by Scepter Records on the national level.

Their debut record for Bunky/Scepter was "Get on Up" (1967), becoming a major hit in the United States, peaking at No. 11 as a pop single and reaching No. 3 on the US Billboard R&B chart. Following the release they played Chicago's Regal Theater and the Apollo Theatre in New York City. Further singles were also successes, and the group released one full-length LP. After five singles on Bunky the group signed a deal with Scepter themselves late in 1968. They later returned to Bunky and then, in 1970, signed with Capitol Records for one single ("Reach Out") and Lamarr Records in 1971 for "Girls in the City".

Perry Moorer played alto saxophone with the group. He died in 1996.

Gilbert Moorer died from throat cancer on August 28, 2008, at the age of 67.

Alvis Moorer died on August 21, 2011, at the age of 71.

Sam Pace died after a long illness on January 7, 2013, at the age of 68.

Edwards, who lives in Chicago, is now the only surviving member of the band from its recording days.

Members
Gilbert Moorer
Alvis Moorer
Betty Moorer
Sam Pace (1961–)
Shawn Taylor (1965–1967)
Millard Edwards
Perry Moorer (alto saxophone)
Goose "Preacher" Hilliard Smith

Discography

Albums

Singles

References

External links
Gilbert Moorer, Jr (1941 - 2008) - Find A Grave Memorial

Musical groups from Wisconsin
Apex Records artists
Capitol Records artists
Wand Records artists